Nilu may refer to:
 Nilu, Fars
 Nilu, Gilan
 Nilu Pardeh Sar, Gilan Province